Shaftholme is a small hamlet in South Yorkshire, England, in the parish of Arksey that is located half a mile north of Bentley and two miles north of Doncaster.

References

Geography of the Metropolitan Borough of Doncaster
Hamlets in South Yorkshire